Clare Miranda Moody (born 30 October 1965) is a British Labour Party politician and trade unionist who served as a Member of the European Parliament (MEP) for South West England from 2014 to 2019.

Early life and career
Clare Miranda Moody was born on 30 October 1965 in Chipping Norton, Oxfordshire to Joan and Raymond Moody. Brought up in Burford, her father served as town mayor and both her parents were Conservative Party activists.

Moody trained as a secretary. Later she studied industrial relations at the University of Kent and began her career in trade unionism at the Banking, Insurance and Finance Union (BIFU). BIFU went through several amalgamations to become UNIFI, Amicus, and later Unite, where she worked as a regional officer in Bournemouth.

Moody worked in the Number 10 Policy Unit under Prime Minister Gordon Brown. She was the Labour candidate for Salisbury, a safe Conservative seat, at the 2005 general election. Moody also stood to become the inaugural Wiltshire Police and Crime Commissioner, reaching the second round as Labour's candidate in the 2012 local elections.

European Parliamentary career 

Moody unsuccessfully contested South West England in the 2004 European Parliament election, in fourth position on the Labour Party list. However, she was elected as a Member of European Parliament for the region in the May 2014 elections, now placed as the lead list candidate.

During her tenure in the European Parliament, Moody served as vice-chair of the Subcommittee on Security and Defence. Furthermore, she has been a member of the Budget, Foreign Affairs, Industry, Research and Energy, and Women's Rights committees.

She was co-chair of the Friends of Georgia group, and worked on the EU-Georgia Association Agreement through her Foreign Affairs committee membership. Moody voted in favour of the Directive on Copyright in the Digital Single Market in 2019, despite concerns that the legislation enforced censorship on EU internet users.

Moody lost her seat in the 2019 European Parliament election, when no Labour candidate was returned in South West England.

Post-Parliamentary career
Moody was appointed Political Director at PR company Grayling in 2019, a subsidiary of Huntsworth, where she later became Senior Strategic Director. In 2021, she was appointed co-CEO of the human rights and equality charity Equally Ours.

In June 2022, Moody was shortlisted to become the Labour candidate in the marginal Stroud constituency, but was not selected.

Political views 
European Union

Moody supported the remain campaign in the 2016 EU membership referendum, and supported a delay before invoking Article 50 to allow for negotiations post-referendum. She chaired the Labour Movement for Europe from 2017 to 2019, which campaigned for a public vote on the final Brexit deal. 

She credited the loss of her European Parliamentary seat in 2019 to Labour's Brexit position, arguing that the party needed to adopt a clear pro-EU stance.

Labour Party

Moody supported Yvette Cooper in the 2015 Labour Party leadership election. During his leadership challenge in June 2016, she supported calls for the resignation of Jeremy Corbyn.

Personal life
Moody resides in Salisbury, Wiltshire. She has a son.

References

1965 births
Living people
Labour Party (UK) MEPs
MEPs for England 2014–2019
21st-century women MEPs for England
Unite the Union
People from Burford
People from Salisbury
Labour Party (UK) parliamentary candidates